Charles Richardson may refer to:

Sportspeople
Charles Richardson (umpire) (1853–1925), English Test cricket umpire
Charles Richardson (cricketer, born 1864) (1864–1949), Australian-born New Zealand cricketer
Charles Richardson (Essex cricketer) (1885–1948), English cricketer who played for Essex
Charles Richardson (Lincolnshire cricketer) (born 1946), former English cricketer who played for Lincolnshire
Charlie Richardson (American football) (1906–1977), former blocking back in the National Football League

Other
Charles Richardson (Royal Navy officer) (1769–1850), British admiral
Charles Lennox Richardson (1834–1862), British merchant
Charles Leslie Richardson (1908–1994), British Army general
Charles Douglas Richardson (1853–1932), British artist
Charles Richardson (civil engineer) (1814–1896), British civil engineer
Charles Richardson (cement merchant) (1819–1878), British businessman
Charles Richardson (Australian politician) (fl. 1861), New South Wales politician
Charles Richardson (Upper Canada politician) (1805–1848), lawyer and political figure in Upper Canada
Charles Richardson (lexicographer) (1775–1865), English teacher, lexicographer and linguist
Charlie Richardson (1934–2012), British mobster
a stage name sometimes used by Marius Goring (1912–1998)
Charles Parks Richardson (born 1971), American entrepreneur, doctor and inventor
Charles S. Richardson (1854–1904), first president of South Dakota's normal school, Madison Normal, that later became Dakota State University
Charles C. Richardson (born 1935), American biochemist and professor
 Charles "Sis Doc" Richardson, American dentist, co-founder of Chi Omega sorority